Teresa Orlowski (born 29 July 1953) is a former German-Polish performer in and a current producer of adult films in Germany. She was one of the biggest European porn stars of the 80s.

Early life
She was born as Teresa Orłowska in Wrocław, Poland and spent her childhood in Dębica, a small city near Tarnów. Despite being Polish, Orlowski is considered the first true German porn star. A former veterinary assistant, she came to West Germany in 1979 and worked first in a nightclub in Wattenscheid, later in a bar at Duisburg Central Station. In 1982, she married pornographic director and photographer Hans Moser.

Career
She debuted in 1983 in the film Foxy Lady, directed by her then-husband Hans Moser. She starred in two early examples of interactive pornography, Mopsparade (1994) and Teresa O. The CD-ROM edition (1995). Together with Moser, she founded the Hannover-based adult production company "VTO" (Verlag Teresa Orlowski / Video Teresa Orlowski); the company went bankrupt after a few years. After her retirement from the adult industry, she moved to Marbella.
 
In addition, Orlowski starred in the music video "Bitte, bitte" by Die Ärzte in 1989. In 1986, Larry Bonville recorded the song Fire Inside for Teresa Orlowski.

References

External links
 
 
 
 
 
 
 

Polish pornographic film actresses
Actors from Wrocław
Polish emigrants to Germany
1953 births
Living people
Polish pornographic film producers
German pornographic film actresses
German pornographic film producers
German people of Polish descent
German women singers